Cooch Behar Airport  is a domestic airport serving the city of Cooch Behar, West Bengal, India and parts of North Bengal and Assam. The airport covers an area of 173 acres.

Facilities 
The airport is located at an elevation of 141 feet (43 m) above mean sea level. It has one runway designated 04/22 with an asphalt surface, measuring  without an instrument landing system, which is necessary for landing of aircraft at night. The airport can handle only flights using visual flight rules during the day. Improvements in radar as well as other runway systems have been completed, such as installation of lights on the runway, while the instrument landing system will be installed in the near future. There is presently a high security team residing in he airport uses a non-directional beacon for navigation services. It presently operates for only private operations, such as for government and VIP aircraft. It is awaiting to resume it's commercial operations as of 28 February 2023.

Recent developments 

In March 2020, lights were installed in the boundaries of the airport and the runway was repaired. Security was also increased in and around the premises.

While the longstanding demand of residents to resume flights from the airport in North Bengal remains unfulfilled for over 25 years, the Airports Authority of India revamped and operationalised the airport at Rupsi in Kokrajhar district of Assam to restart services after three decades, to handle the traffic.

The airport's license was valid till 27 January 2021, but the Directorate General of Civil Aviation (India) decided not to renew the license until further notice. As of February 2023, it is set to receive its license again in January 2024 to restart commercial operations, with daily flights to Kolkata operated by the new low-cost regional airline, IndiaOne Air.

Airlines and destinations

See also
 List of airports by ICAO code
 List of airports in West Bengal
 List of airports in India

References

External links

Airports in West Bengal
Buildings and structures in Cooch Behar district
Transport in Cooch Behar
Year of establishment missing